Terry Matthews (born 1943) is a Welsh-Canadian business magnate.

Terry Matthews may also refer to:

 Terry Matthews (footballer) (born 1936), English footballer
 Terry Matthews (rugby league), Australian rugby league player

See also
 Terry Mathews (1964–2012), American baseball player